Simon Shackleton is an English electronic musician and DJ. His music has appeared on films such as The Matrix, Arlington Road & Charlie's Angels, video games such as the  MotorStorm (series). From 1996, he has performed as a solo electronic music producer under a number of aliases including the multi-genre Elite Force, and has won several high-profile music awards including a 2011 Beatport award for the highest selling breakbeat track of the year. In the same year he won two International Breakbeat Awards Awards (aka Breakspoll Awards), one for Best Producer and one for Best Label (for his highly regarded U&A imprint). Prior to this he ran the Fused & Bruised imprint between 1996–2002, and is often cited as one of the leading proponents of the emergent Tech-Funk movement, fusing house, breakbeat, & electro.

While a student at Exeter University he started his first band, Headless Chickens with future Radiohead vocalist Thom Yorke whom he went on to form a band called Flicker Noise who signed to Concrete Records, an offshoot of Deconstruction.  He was then one half of the English duo Lunatic Calm, with whom he released two albums, namely Metropol in 1997 and Breaking Point in 2002. Some of his songs (both remixes and new tracks) have appeared on The Crystal Method remix albums, Community Service and Community Service II amongst others .

Despite attempting to keep his identity a secret, Shackleton also became well known as the electro producer Zodiac Cartel between 2007 and 2012, and prior to that had recorded under multiple shorter-lived aliases such as Killer Elite, Futurecore, Double Black, pHrack R and Synchromesh. In 2014, he became increasingly renowned for his long house and techno DJ sets. He also manages the Stereophoenix label, which describes its ethos as "electronic music with heart & soul".

References

External links 
 
 Simon Shackleton website

Year of birth missing (living people)
English electronic musicians
English house musicians
English record producers
DJs from London
Electronic dance music DJs
Living people
Big beat musicians